Kenny Vigier (born January 2, 1979 in Mantes-la-Jolie, Yvelines) is a former French professional football player.

He played on the professional level in Ligue 2 for FC Martigues.

1979 births
Living people
People from Mantes-la-Jolie
French footballers
Ligue 2 players
FC Martigues players
AS Cannes players
Paris FC players
US Sénart-Moissy players
Pau FC players
US Raon-l'Étape players
ES Viry-Châtillon players
FC Mantois 78 players
Association football forwards
Footballers from Yvelines